Saint Metrophanes (? – 326) was the bishop of Byzantium from 306 to 314. He may have retired from his episcopacy and died as late as 326.

There is a tradition that, before his death, the Emperor Constantine I bestowed upon him the honorary title of Patriarch; however, Byzantium did not become the capital of the Empire until 330 (when it was renamed New Rome or Constantinople), and the see was not elevated to a patriarchate until 451.
Metrophanes I could not partake in the first Ecumenical Council, which was held at Nicaea, due to age and ill health (he was already bedridden). He sent instead Alexander, the first among his presbyters, an honest man, whom he destined as his successor. For it is said that, when the Council had ended and the king with the god-bearing fathers returned, he was told by God that Alexander, and after him Paul, pleased God, and are good for this position.

Metrophanes has been canonized a saint, and is revered in both the Eastern Orthodox Church and the Roman Catholic Church. His feast day is June 4.

His predecessor as Bishop of Byzantium was Probus, son of Dometius, and Metrophanes may have been the son of Probus.

See also
Metrophanes of Smyrna

References

External links
 St Metrophanes the first Patriarch of Constantinople.

4th-century Romans
Saints from Constantinople
Roman-era Byzantines
4th-century Byzantine bishops
4th-century Christian saints
Bishops of Byzantium
326 deaths
Year of birth unknown